The Council of Ministers (Conselho de Ministros) consists of the President, Prime Minister and the Ministers.

Current Cabinet

See also
 Politics of Mozambique

References

Mozambique